Brand New Immortals was an American rock trio formed by David Ryan Harris, drummer Kenny Cresswell, and former bassist for The Black Crowes, Johnny Colt. The group released a successful 6 track EP and were signed to Elektra Records. In 2001, the trio produced a full length album entitled Tragic Show, which the band felt that Elektra did not properly promote. Early the next year the band broke up

Discography
Piston, Protein, Afro-Sheen (2000)
Tragic Show (2001)

Singles
2001 ''Reasons Why

References

External links
 Brand New Immortals at Hip Online
 Brand New Immortals at Amazon.com

Musical groups established in 2000
Rock music groups from Georgia (U.S. state)
Musical groups from Atlanta
American hard rock musical groups